Frank Winters (March 31, 1894 – July 29, 1980) was American football and basketball coach in the states of Illinois and Wisconsin.

Madison High School (WI)
Winters began coaching football in 1912 at Madison High School in Madison, Wisconsin.  His 2-year stay in Madison brought forth an undefeated season as well as a weather shortened season, compiling a total record of 9 wins and 1 loss.

Rockford Central High School
Winters left Madison and moved south to Rockford, Illinois and began coaching at Rockford Central High School.  While at Rockford, Winters' basketball teams compiled 95 wins while suffering only 12 losses.  During the 1918–19 season, Winters guided his team to an I.H.S.A. state championship with a 39–20 victory over Springfield High School.  During this same time frame, Winters also coached Rockford's football team.  Between 1914 and 1919, his football teams won 39 games, lost 12 while tying 3.  Rockford joined the Big 7 conference in 1917, with Rockford winning the football title the same year.

University of Illinois
In 1920, Winters departed Rockford and became the head basketball coach of the University of Illinois.  During his two-year stint as coach of the Fighting Illini, he had a 25-12 record.

Oak Park & River Forest
After departing from the University of Illinois, Winters returned to high school coaching at Oak Park & River Forest High School.  While coaching the Huskies, Winters headed the football and track & field teams.  His football teams compiled an overall record of 35 wins, 13 losses and 6 ties.  The track & field teams won 2 Illinois Interscholastic state titles.

Head coaching record

High school basketball

High school football

High school track and field

College basketball

References

1894 births
1980 deaths
American men's basketball coaches
American men's basketball players
Basketball coaches from Illinois
Basketball players from Illinois
Central Missouri Mules basketball coaches
High school basketball coaches in Illinois
High school football coaches in Illinois
High school football coaches in Wisconsin
Illinois Fighting Illini men's basketball coaches
Sportspeople from Rockford, Illinois
Springfield Pride men's basketball coaches
Springfield Pride men's basketball players